A perfect score is the best possible a score in a game or sport. Perfect score may also refer to:

The Perfect Score, 2004 American film
Perfect Score, American game show beginning in 2013
 Perfect 10 (gymnastics), highest score possible for a single routine in artistic gymnastics
 Perfect game (bowling), highest score possible in a game of bowling

See also
Perfect 10 (disambiguation)
Score (sport)
Game score